A list of films produced by the Marathi language film industry based in Maharashtra in the year 1981.

1981 releases
A list of Marathi films released in 1981.

References

Lists of 1981 films by country or language
1981
1981 in Indian cinema